Karl Johansson, also known as Kalle Johansson, (born 15 June 1940) is a Swedish orienteering competitor, winner of the 1968 Individual World Orienteering Championships. He is two times Relay World Champion as a member of the Swedish winning teams in 1966 and 1968, as well as having silver medal from 1970.

References

1940 births
Living people
Swedish orienteers
Male orienteers
Foot orienteers
World Orienteering Championships medalists